Dark Skies is a 2013 American science fiction horror film written and directed by Scott Stewart, produced by Jason Blum under his Blumhouse Productions banner, and starring Keri Russell, Josh Hamilton, Dakota Goyo and J. K. Simmons.

Dark Skies was released in the United States on February 22, 1989, by Dimension Films. The film grossed $42.0 million worldwide and received mixed reviews from critics, with many praising the performances, direction and atmosphere, but criticized its screenplay, muddled plot and characters.

Plot
The Barrett family—mother Lacy, father Daniel, older son Jesse, and younger son Sammy—reside on a quiet suburban street in an unnamed American city. Daniel is currently unemployed, placing the burden of supporting the family on Lacy, who works as a real estate agent. Their two sons enjoy a happy relationship and communicate with each other from their beds via walkie-talkie. A number of strange occurrences befall the family. During the night, the contents of the kitchen are rearranged in bizarre configurations. The house alarm's set off when it detects that all entry points were breached simultaneously. Sammy suffers a fit while at the park, and Lacy is shocked when hundreds of birds suddenly crash into the house.

One night, Lacy is awakened by a sound from Sammy's room. When she checks on him, through the darkness she sees a figure standing over his bed. She turns on the light to find an empty room. Sammy is found walking away from the house but cannot remember leaving. Lacy, Daniel and Jesse each suffer catatonic episodes and regain consciousness with no memory of their experiences. Sammy's discovered to have marks on his body at a pool party while Jesse experiences an episode in the woods and is admitted to the hospital where geometric shapes are also discovered on his body, prompting the doctors to alert Child Protective Services.

Greatly disturbed by the various phenomena afflicting the family and the house, Lacy begins to search online for answers and finds articles attributing some of what they have experienced to UFOs and reports of alien abduction. Daniel installs security cameras throughout the house. Daniel reviews the night's footage and frame-by-frame analysis reveals 3 dark figures standing over their beds as they slept. Now believing that there's an extraterrestrial force at work, Lacy and Daniel seek the help of a specialist, Edwin Pollard, who calls the beings "the Greys."

Pollard informs them that many others have suffered the same fate as the Barretts, with most cases ending in a child abduction. Edwin warns the Barretts that the person who the Greys first show interest in is usually the one who is abducted and that they should be highly protective of Sammy, who he believes has been "chosen." Daniel buys a shotgun while Lacy adopts an aggressive guard dog. The family spends July 4 boarding up the windows and front door of the house, then eat dinner, as Daniel flips the TV on to a program showing fireworks and playing patriotic music, while they reminisce about happier times.

Suddenly, the TV fills with static, and the house lights begin to flicker, while the dog starts barking ferociously towards a boarded up window. Daniel sends Lacy and the boys upstairs to Jesse's room, as he arms himself with the shotgun. A bright light starts to shine outside of the window, towards Daniel. Upstairs, Lacy instructs both boys to not open the door under any circumstance. The power in the house goes off, as Lacy stands guard outside the bedroom door, armed with a kitchen knife. She hears the TV in her bedroom turn on, she walks towards it, unaware of a being standing directly behind her, and becomes trapped in the room. Daniel gets Jesse and Sammy into his and Lacy's room where they barricade themselves inside and huddle together on the bed. The TV begins to flicker again and the beings – now revealed to be Greys – materialize in the room.

Jesse blacks out and experiences a hallucination in which his father commits suicide alongside his mother's bloodied body. Seeing his brother, Jesse chases after Sammy before reawakening in the upstairs hallway of his house. The Greys appear in front of him, and he disappears with them in a flash of light, the rest of the family powerless to help. Three months later, Lacy and Daniel are suspects in Jesse's disappearance case and have moved into an apartment. Pollard balefully cuts out a newspaper article about Jesse's disappearance and hangs it on his wall with other pictures of missing children. As Lacy is going through old things, she finds pictures that Jesse drew as a child that shows the Greys surrounding him. She belatedly realizes that it was Jesse, not Sammy, in whom the Greys first showed interest, and that he was the one who had been chosen. Feedback then emanates from a nearby walkie-talkie as Lacy and Sammy both hear Jesse's faint voice calling Sammy's name.

Cast

Production
Production commenced on August 3, 2012. Filming locations included Los Angeles and Valencia, CA (College of the Canyons). The film was written and directed by Scott Stewart, and produced by Jason Blum, Jeanette Brill, and Couper Samuelson. The film's screenplay that Stewart wrote himself took about six weeks to complete.

Release
Dark Skies was released in the United States on February 22, 2013, and in the United Kingdom on April 5, 2013.

Home media
The film was released on DVD and Blu-ray on May 28, 2013. Together, the Blu-ray and DVD grossed $6.6 million in domestic video sales.

Critical response

Dark Skies received mixed reviews from film critics. Review aggregator Rotten Tomatoes gives the film a 41% rating, based on reviews from 93 critics, with the site's critical consensus being: "Dark Skies writer director Scott Stewart has a solid cast, an interesting premise, and some admirable ambitions, but he can't figure out what to do with any of them, and the result is a dull, muddled effort that will bore all but the most devoted horror buffs." Metacritic gives the film a score of 50 out of 100, based on reviews from 19 critics, indicating "mixed or average reviews".

Michael O'Sullivan of The Washington Post gave the film two out of four stars, and wrote that "[t]he movie builds a moderate, if less than monumental, level of spookiness, regardless of your ignorance. It's a workmanlike piece of suspense." In a moderately favorable review for The New York Times, Andy Webster praised the film for the "consummate dexterity" with which it employs worn-out horror devices.

References

External links
 
 
 
 

2013 films
2013 horror films
2013 independent films
2010s science fiction horror films
American independent films
American science fiction horror films
Films directed by Scott Stewart (director)
Films produced by Jason Blum
Films scored by Joseph Bishara
Alien abduction films
Films about extraterrestrial life
Alien invasions in films
Films shot in Los Angeles
Independence Day (United States) films
Blumhouse Productions films
Dimension Films films
The Weinstein Company films
Holiday horror films
2010s English-language films
2010s American films